Patrick Purcell (born 13 May 1992) is an Irish hurler who plays as a midfielder with the Laois senior team.

Career statistics

Honours

Rathdowney-Errill
Laois Senior Hurling Championship (3): 2010, 2012, 2014, 2019

References

1992 births
Living people
Rathdowney-Errill hurlers
Laois inter-county hurlers